Stow Bedon railway station is a closed station in Stow Bedon, Norfolk. It was initially opened in 1869 by the Great Eastern Railway network and became London and North Eastern Railway in 1923. It became British Railways in 1948 who closed the station in 1964.

References

Stow Bedon station on navigable 1946 O. S. map

Disused railway stations in Norfolk
Former Great Eastern Railway stations
Railway stations in Great Britain opened in 1869
Railway stations in Great Britain closed in 1964
Beeching closures in England